Tiago André Magalhães Soares (born 9 November 1988) is a Portuguese former futsal player who played as a winger for several teams in the Liga Portuguesa de Futsal including Freixieiro, Modicus Sandim, and Fundão. Soares was capped 14 times for the Portugal national team and won the 2008 Futsal Mundialito with them.

References

External links

Tiago Soares at playmakerstats.com (formerly thefinalball.com)

1988 births
Living people
People from Gondomar, Portugal
Portuguese men's futsal players
AR Freixieiro players
Sportspeople from Porto District